Area code 334 is a telephone area code in the North American Numbering Plan (NANP) for southeastern Alabama. It was created on January 15, 1995, in an area code split from area code 205. It was the first new area code in Alabama since the announcement of the area code system in 1947. To permit a transition period for the reconfiguration of equipment, such as computers and fax machines, use of area code 205 continued in the 334 region through May 13, 1995.

The numbering plan area (NPA) comprises the Montgomery, Auburn-Opelika, and Dothan metropolitan areas, as well as Phenix City and the Alabama side of the Columbus, Georgia metro area.  The original 334 territory included the southern half of Alabama. The southwestern part of the numbering plan area was split off with Area code 251 in 2001, including Mobile.

Area code 334 was the first interchangeable NPA code, not having the middle digit of 0 or 1, officially preceding Washington area code 360 by one minute.

Exhaustion projections in 2022 suggested that an additional area code will be needed in southeastern Alabama by 2025.

See also
List of Alabama area codes
List of NANP area codes

References

External links

Telecommunications-related introductions in 1995
334
334